The following list shows the recipients for the Country Music Association Award for Male Vocalist of the Year. This Award goes to the artist. The Award is based on individual musical performance on a solo Country single or album release, as well as the overall contribution to Country Music. This award was one of the original awards given at the first ceremony in 1967. The first recipient was Jack Greene. The most recent recipient is Chris Stapleton.

Recipients

Category facts 
Most wins

Most nominations

Win on first nomination

In CMA history only thirteen men have won Male Vocalist of the Year the very first time they were nominated. They are:

 Jack Greene (1967)
 Glen Campbell (1968)
 Charlie Rich (1973)
 Ronnie Milsap (1974)
 George Jones (1980)
 Ricky Skaggs (1982)
 Lee Greenwood (1983)
 Clint Black (1990)
 Vince Gill (1991)
 Toby Keith (2001)
 Keith Urban (2004)
 Blake Shelton (2010)
 Chris Stapleton (2015)

References

See also 

 Country Music Association Awards

Country Music Association Awards